The Izvorul Alb (also: Cracul Mare) is a left tributary of the river Asău in Romania. Its source is in the Tarcău Mountains. It discharges into the Asău in Păltiniș.

References

Rivers of Romania
Rivers of Bacău County